Pseudomonas acidophila is a Gram-negative soil bacterium that produces the beta-lactam antibiotic, sulfazecin, as well as bulgecins. It was first isolated in Japan. Because this organism is patented, it is not officially recognized as a legitimate Pseudomonas species, and therefore has no type strain. It is available, however, through the American Type Culture Collection.

References

Pseudomonadales
Bacteria described in 1980